Hollowville is a hamlet in Columbia County, New York, United States. Hollowville has a post office with ZIP code 12530.

References

Hamlets in Columbia County, New York
Hamlets in New York (state)